Jennifer L. Flanagan is a former member of the Massachusetts General Court and the Massachusetts Cannabis Control Commission.

Education
Leominster High School; University of Massachusetts Boston, B.A. Political Science; Fitchburg State College, M.S. Mental Health Counseling.

Political career 
Flanagan served as a legislative aide and then chief of staff to then-Leominster State Rep. Mary Jane Simmons. In 2004 Simmons announced she would not seek re-election to the 4th Worcester district due to health concerns, and Flanagan ran for the open seat. Flanagan won the primary and general election, and served two terms as a Massachusetts State Representative.

Flanagan served as a Massachusetts State Senator for the Worcester and Middlesex district, which includes her hometown of Leominster. She is a Democrat who served from 2009, to 2017. She first won the State Senate seat in 2008, winning a contested Democratic primary and facing no general election opponent. When running for re-election in 2014 the nomination forms to get Flanagan on the primary ballot were filed with an incomplete address, forcing her to run a write-in campaign during the primary in order to be on the general election ballot. There was no candidate for the seat on either the Republican or Democratic primary ballots. Her general election opponent, Richard Bastien, also got on the general election ballot with a write-in campaign in the primary.

In 2017, Flanagan was chosen by Massachusetts Governor Charlie Baker as his pick for the newly formed Massachusetts Cannabis Control Commission. The appointment was notable because she opposed cannabis legalization and is from a different party than the governor. She stepped down in 2021 to become the director of regulatory policy at Vicente Sederberg.

References

External links
www.jenflanagan.com
Legislature webpage

Massachusetts state senators
Members of the Massachusetts House of Representatives
Women state legislators in Massachusetts
People from Leominster, Massachusetts
University of Massachusetts Boston alumni
Year of birth missing (living people)
Living people
Fitchburg State University alumni
21st-century American politicians
21st-century American women politicians